Ighoud (In Berber: Iɣud ⵉⵖⵓⴷ) is a town in Youssoufia Province, Marrakesh-Safi, Morocco. According to the 2004 census it has a population of 1475.

References

Populated places in Youssoufia Province